The 2012 Challengers League was the sixth season of amateur K3 League.

The Challengers League maintained home and away season of two groups and a one-time interleague play. The winners and runners-up of both groups qualified for the championship playoffs like before. On the basis of the overall standings, however, third and fourth-placed club entered the first round, and second and first-placed club directly advanced to the semi-final and final respectively.

18 clubs participated in this season after Jungnang Chorus Mustang and Paju Citizen joined the league. Asan Citizen moved its city to Yesan before the start of the season, and changed its name to Yesan Citizen.

Teams

Regular season

Group A

Group B

Overall table

Championship playoffs

Bracket

First round

Semi-final

Final

See also
2012 in South Korean football
2012 Challengers Cup
2012 Korean FA Cup

References

External links

K3 League (2007–2019) seasons
2012 in South Korean football